Wai Hoi-ying (also known as Wei Haiying, born January 5, 1971) is a female Chinese and Hong Kong association football player who competed in the 1996 Summer Olympics for China women's national football team. Between 2011 and 2015 she was the Sham Shui Po District Councillor for the Nam Shan, Tai Hang Tung & Tai Hang Sai constituency in Hong Kong.

In 1996 she won the silver medal with the Chinese team. She played four matches including the final and scored two goals.

International goals

References

External links

profile

1971 births
Living people
Chinese women's footballers
Olympic footballers of China
Footballers at the 1996 Summer Olympics
Olympic silver medalists for China
Olympic medalists in football
1991 FIFA Women's World Cup players
1995 FIFA Women's World Cup players
District councillors of Sham Shui Po District
Kowloon West New Dynamic politicians
Asian Games medalists in football
Footballers at the 1990 Asian Games
Footballers at the 1994 Asian Games
Medalists at the 1996 Summer Olympics
China women's international footballers
Asian Games gold medalists for China
Women's association footballers not categorized by position
Medalists at the 1990 Asian Games
Medalists at the 1994 Asian Games